The 1937 Swiss Grand Prix was a 750 kg Formula race held on 22 August 1937 at the Bremgarten Circuit.

Race Report
After the start, Hans Stuck chopped across the nose of the other drivers to take the early lead, followed by Caracciola and Rosemeyer. Rosemeyer was soon in trouble though, under pressure from Lang he skidded off the circuit and was bogged down in the wet ground. Some spectators came to his assistance but their help would have resulted in a disqualification so he retired his car.

Stuck could not maintain his early pace under pressure from the Mercedes' and was soon passed by Caracciola, Lang and von Brauchitsch.

Nuvolari drove for the Auto Union team for this race as he wasn't impressed with the new Alfa. However, the tricky rear-engined Auto Union was not a car to race without some practice, even for a man of Nuvolari's skill. The wet track simply compounded his problems. Whilst running in 8th place he was called into the pits and the car-less Rosemeyer took over, eventually getting up to 5th place and putting in the fastest lap in his chase after the Mercedes'.

Fagioli was also having problems being in some pain with his hip, when he retired Nuvolari decided to give it another go and brought the car home 7th.

In the closing laps Lang closed on Caracciola but was ordered to maintain position and von Brauchitsch passed Stuck for a Mercedes 1,2,3.

Classification

Swiss Grand Prix
Swiss Grand Prix
Grand Prix
August 1937 sports events